Maurizio Pagani (27 January 1936 – 7 February 2014) was an Italian engineer and politician who served as the minister of post and telecommunications during the period 1992–1994 in two successive cabinets, and as the mayor of Novara.

Early life and education
Pagani was born in Milan on 27 January 1936. He received a bachelor's degree in hydraulic engineering from the Polytechnic University of Milan.

Career
Following his graduation Pagani worked for various companies as an engineer. His political career began in 1972 when he was elected as a councillor for the Italian Democratic Socialist Party (PSDI), a position he held until 1978. He was subsequently elected as the mayor of Novara and served in the post until 1981. Pagani was elected to the Italian Senate in 1983 and 1987. He became a member of the Italian Parliament and was appointed Minister of Post and Telecommunications in June 1992. He was in office until May 1994 and served in two successive cabinets: in the cabinet led by Giuliano Amato, and then in the cabinet led by Carlo Azeglio Ciampi.

In the local elections of June 1999 Pagani was elected the President of the Province of Novara as an independent candidate, serving in the post until 2004 when he was replaced by Sergio Vedovato. Pagani had, by this time, left the PSDI and joined Forza Italia (FI). He then worked as a consultant for various companies.

Personal life and death
Pagani was married to Daniela Pagani and had a son. He died in Novara on 7 February 2014 following a heart attack. His funeral ceremony was held in the basilica of San Gaudenzio on 8 February.

References

External links
 

20th-century Italian engineers
21st-century Italian engineers
1936 births
2014 deaths
Deputies of Legislature XI of Italy
Government ministers of Italy
Politicians from Milan
Mayors of places in Italy
Hydraulic engineers
Polytechnic University of Milan alumni
Senators of Legislature X of Italy
Senators of Legislature IX of Italy
Italian Democratic Socialist Party politicians
Forza Italia politicians